Hărman (German: Honigberg; Hungarian: Szászhermány) is a commune in Brașov County, Transylvania, Romania. It is composed of two villages, Hărman and Podu Oltului (Vámoshíd). The commune is located some 10 km east of Brașov, in the Burzenland region of southeastern Transylvania.

Hărman was established and long inhabited mainly by Transylvanian Saxons.

At the 2011 census, 90.6% of inhabitants were Romanians, 4.7% Roma, 2.3% Hungarians and 1.2% Germans.

References

Communes in Brașov County
Localities in Transylvania
Burzenland